The Iraqi Special Republican Guard (SRG), also known as the Special Forces Brigade of the Presidential Palace,  Republican Guard Special Protection Forces, or the Golden Division, was an Iraqi personal security force founded in either early 1992 or March 1995 in Ba'athist-era Iraq. The Special Republican Guard was controlled by the Special Security Organization and charged with protecting President Saddam Hussein, presidential sites, Baghdad, and responding to any rebellion, coup, or other threat to his power.

History
In order to prevent a coup d'etat, Saddam Hussein forbade the Special Republican Guard (SRG) from coordinating with other forces, even the normal Republican Guard and no other units were ever allowed near SRG.

The Special Republican Guard received better pay and benefits than members of the normal Republican Guard and the regular Iraqi Army. By 2002, there were reportedly 12,000 members of the Special Republican Guard, drawn primarily from clans loyal to Saddam Hussein and his regime.  As many as five brigades containing 14 battalions of 1,300–1,500 men each, and also included air defense, armored, and artillery were reported to be in existence at that time. On 23 May 2003, the Special Republican Guard was officially dissolved per Order 2 of the Coalition Provisional Authority under Administrator Paul Bremer, in the wake of the invasion of Iraq by a U.S.-led international coalition.

Former members of the Special Republican Guard were later suspected of carrying out insurgent attacks on Coalition forces in Iraq after the invasion, but also seemed to form the cadre around which the various Sons of Iraq or Anbar Awakening home guard militias, funded, trained, equipped and operated alongside American forces were composed of.

Structure
The SRG had 13 or 14 battalions and ranged in troop strength from 15,000 to 26,000. This may have fallen to only 12,000 by 2002.
 1st Brigade
 2nd Brigade
 3rd Brigade
 4th Brigade
 Air Defense Command
 Tank Command

References

Further reading
 Sean Boyle, 'Saddam's shield: the role of the Special Republican Guard,' Jane's Intelligence Review, January 1999

Military units and formations of Iraq
Former guards regiments
Protective security units
Military units and formations established in the 1990s
Military units and formations disestablished in 2003
Military units and formations of the Iraq War
1990s establishments in Iraq
2003 disestablishments in Iraq